Xanthoparmelia micromaculata is a species of saxicolous (rock-dwelling), lichen in the family Parmeliaceae. Found in South Africa, it was formally described as a new species in 2002 by Australian lichenologist John Elix. It is only known from the type locality. It contains several lichen products: stictic acid as a major metabolite, minor amounts of usnic acid, constictic acid, and hypostictic acid, and minor or trace amounts of norstictic acid, hyposalazinic acid, and cryptostictic acid. The species epithet refers to the prominent maculae (small pale spots or blotches) on the thallus surface.

See also
List of Xanthoparmelia species

References

micromaculata
Lichen species
Lichens described in 2002
Lichens of South Africa
Taxa named by John Alan Elix